Bruntcliffe Academy (formerly Bruntcliffe School) is a coeducational secondary school located in Morley, West Yorkshire, England. It is situated on Bruntcliffe Lane in Morley, and is one of three secondary schools in the area.

History
Bruntcliffe Secondary School was built in the early 1960s on land adjacent to Bruntcliffe Lane. The arrival of the school saw the closure of Margetson County Secondary School in Drighlington.

In 2011, the school became a part of the Bruntcliffe Co-operative Learning Trust. In 2015, the school was transferred to the GORSE Academies Trust and became known as Bruntcliffe Academy.

Ofsted
In February 2018, Bruntcliffe Academy was inspected by Ofsted for the first time since it became an academy. Ofsted judged the school to be 'Good' overall. In addition to this, they judged Leadership and Management, Teaching and Learning, Personal Development and Welfare to be 'Outstanding'.

Notable former pupils
Daniel Broadbent, footballer
Jack Broadbent, Rugby player
Beverley Callard, actress
Jonathan Howson footballer

References

External links
 Bruntcliffe Academy official Website

Secondary schools in Leeds
Morley, West Yorkshire
Academies in Leeds